Thelymitra orientalis is a rare species of orchid in the family Orchidaceae and is endemic to southern continental Australia. It has a single thread-like, cylindrical leaf and a single deep blue, streaked flower. It is similar to T. mucida but is distinguished from that species by its filiform leaf and smaller flower.

Description
The lobe on the top of the anther is black with a yellow tip divided into two parts with wavy edges. The side lobes have a few yellow hairs. Flowering occurs between late October and early-November and the flowers only open on hot days.

Taxonomy and naming
Thelymitra orientalis was first formally described in 2010 by Robert Bates from a specimen he collected in The Marshes Native Forest Reserve near Millicent in 2003. The description was published in the Journal of the Adelaide Botanic Garden. The specific epithet (orientalis) is a Latin word meaning "of the east", referring to fact that this orchid is related to T. mucida which is mainly a Western Australian species.

Distribution and habitat
This thelymitra grows in damp heath in high rainfall areas. It is found in western Victoria and the far south-east of South Australia.

References

orientalis
Endemic orchids of Australia
Orchids of Victoria (Australia)
Plants described in 2010